A prosthetic group is the non-amino acid component that is part of the structure of the heteroproteins or conjugated proteins, being tightly linked to the apoprotein.

Not to be confused with the cosubstrate that binds to the enzyme apoenzyme (either a holoprotein or heteroprotein) by non-covalent binding a non-protein (non-amino acid) 

This is a component of a conjugated protein that is required for the protein's biological activity. The prosthetic group may be organic (such as a vitamin, sugar, RNA, phosphate or lipid) or inorganic (such as a metal ion). Prosthetic groups are bound tightly to proteins and may even be attached through a covalent bond. They often play an important role in enzyme catalysis. A protein without its prosthetic group is called an apoprotein, while a protein combined with its prosthetic group is called a holoprotein. A non-covalently bound prosthetic group cannot generally be removed from the holoprotein without denaturating the protein. Thus, the term "prosthetic group" is a very general one and its main emphasis is on the tight character of its binding to the apoprotein. It defines a structural property, in contrast to the term "coenzyme" that defines a functional property.

Prosthetic groups are a subset of cofactors. Loosely bound metal ions and coenzymes are still cofactors, but are generally not called prosthetic groups. In enzymes, prosthetic groups are involved in the catalytic mechanism and required for activity. Other prosthetic groups have structural properties. This is the case for the sugar and lipid moieties in glycoproteins and lipoproteins or RNA in ribosomes. They can be very large, representing the major part of the protein in proteoglycans for instance.

The heme group in hemoglobin is a prosthetic group. Further examples of organic prosthetic groups are vitamin derivatives: thiamine pyrophosphate, pyridoxal-phosphate and biotin. Since prosthetic groups are often vitamins or made from vitamins, this is one of the reasons why vitamins are required in the human diet. Inorganic prosthetic groups are usually transition metal ions such as iron (in heme groups, for example in cytochrome c oxidase and hemoglobin), zinc (for example in carbonic anhydrase), copper (for example in complex IV of the respiratory chain) and molybdenum (for example in nitrate reductase).

List of prosthetic groups 
The table below contains a list of some of the most common prosthetic groups.

References

External links

Cofactors PowerPoint lecture

Cofactors

de:Prosthetische Gruppe